Suriyawong may refer to:

Suriyawong Subdistrict in Bangkok
Somdet Chaophraya Sri Suriwongse, also written as Si Suriyawong, a Thai noble
Suriyawong (Ender's Game), a character in the Ender's Game series

See also
Surawong Road